Leiopotherapon plumbeus, known commonly as the silver perch, is a species of fish in the family Terapontidae, the grunters. It is endemic to the Philippines, where it is called ayungin, bugaong, bigaong, and bagaong.

Description
This species reaches 16 centimeters in maximum length.

Behavior
The species exhibits paternal care, as the male guards and tends the eggs.

Uses
The fish is caught and consumed locally as food. It is considered to be one of the most delicious of the native freshwater fish in the Philippines. The supply has run thin due to overharvesting, and it is now rare in markets, making it quite expensive.

The fish is also used to feed ducks.

Conservation
Populations have declined due to overfishing. In 1991 it was the most abundant fish in Laguna de Bay, the largest lake in the Philippines; by 2002 it was the third most abundant. Sedimentation and pollution contribute to the population drop in the lake.

The fish is being reared in captive breeding projects, in which it grows well on a diet of prawn food and tubifex worms. It is dosed with hormones to induce spawning.

Gallery

References

Further reading
 Quilang, J. P., et al. (2007). Meristic and morphometric variation in the silver perch, Leiopotherapon plumbeus (Kner, 1864), from three lakes in the Philippines. Journal of Applied Ichthyology 23(5), 561–67.

Terapontidae
Philippine cuisine
Endemic fauna of the Philippines
Freshwater fish of the Philippines
Fish described in 1864
Taxa named by Rudolf Kner